Alila Hotels and Resorts, is a luxury hotel brand that operates in Indonesia, Malaysia, India, Oman, China, and the United States. Alila is a Sanskrit word meaning "surprise" in English.

In November 2018, Alila became part of the American multinational hospitality company, Hyatt Hotels Corporation.

History

Meaning "surprise" in Sanskrit, Alila Hotels and Resorts was founded in May 2001 by Indonesian businessman Franky Tjahyadikarta, banker Mark Edleson, and hotelier Frederic Simon. The company was launched when Edleson and Tjahyadikarta started the contentious management takeover of their then GHM-managed hotels in Bali, then known as The Serai and The Chedi. The first Alila hotel opened in Jakarta in 2001, shortly followed by the opening of Alila Manggis and Alila Ubud, following their termination from GHM. In 2004, the company's headquarters were moved from Bali, Indonesia to Singapore.

In May 2014, Alila announced a partnership with Commune Hotels, owners of Joie de Vivre Hotels, Thompson Hotels and tommie. Shortly after the initial partnership, Commune acquired 51% purchase of Alila in Edleson's bid to expand ownership. In 2016, the Alila and the other Commune-owned brands were absorbed into the newly created holding company Two Roads Hospitality, following Commune's merger with Destination Hotels. In November 2018, Alila joined Hyatt as part of the Hyatt Hotels Corporation's $480 million-acquisition of Two Roads Hospitality.

Awards
 The Best Foreign Hotel Brand 2010 – Condé Nast Traveller

References

Hospitality companies of Singapore
Hotel chains in Singapore
2001 establishments